Kate Liu (born May 23, 1994 in Singapore) is a Singaporean American classical pianist. On October 20, 2015 she won the third prize (bronze medal), the audience favorite award, and the Polish Radio Award for the best performance of a mazurka in the 17th International Fryderyk Chopin Piano Competition in Warsaw, Poland.

Biography
Liu began playing piano at the age of four. At the age of six, she was admitted to the gifted music program of the Yamaha Music School in Singapore. When she was eight, she moved with her family to the Chicago area, United States. In Chicago, she studied piano with Alan Chow, Micah Yui and Emilio del Rosario in the Academy program for talented young pianists and string players at the Music Institute of Chicago. She graduated from New Trier High School in 2012 and 
received her Bachelor of Music degree from the Curtis Institute of Music. While studying at Curtis Institute, she was named a 2018-19 Gilmore Rising Star.   She is currently pursuing her graduate degree at the Juilliard School, where she studies with Robert McDonald and Yoheved Kaplinsky.
She has won several prizes at international piano competitions:
 2010: New York International Piano Competition in New York City, USA – 1st prize
 2010: Thomas & Evon Cooper International Competition in Oberlin, USA – 3rd prize
 2011: Hilton Head International Piano Competition for Young Artists in Hilton Head, USA - 6th prize
 2012: Eastman Young Artist International Piano Competition in Rochester, USA – 3rd prize 
 2014: Montreal International Musical Competition in Montreal, Canada - finalist
 2015: The 3rd Asia-Pacific International Chopin Competition in Daegu, South Korea – 1st prize
 2015: 17th International Fryderyk Chopin Piano Competition in Warsaw, Poland (2015) – 3rd prize (bronze medal) and the special prize by the Polish Radio for the best performance of Mazurkas
 2022: Quarterfinalist, Sixteenth Van Cliburn International Piano Competition

As a soloist, Liu has performed in many major venues including the Seoul Arts Center, Tokyo Metropolitan Theatre, Carnegie’s Weill Hall, Severance Hall in Cleveland, La Maison Symphonique de Montréal, Warsaw National Philharmonic, Kennedy Center in Washington, D.C., Shanghai Concert Hall, Osaka Symphony Hall, Polish National Radio Symphony Orchestra Hall, the Phillips Collection, and so on. She has collaborated with the Cleveland Orchestra, Warsaw Philharmonic Orchestra, Orchestre Symphonique de Montréal, Polish Radio Orchestra, Poznan Philharmonic, Yomiuri Nippon Symphony Orchestra, Daegu Symphony Orchestra, Rochester Philharmonic, Hilton Head Symphony Orchestra, and Evanston Symphony Orchestra.

Reception from the Polish public
During the Chopin competition, she had wide popular support from the Polish public. For example, she received the highest number of votes cast by listeners of the Second Program of the Polish Radio, and won the contest "My Chopin." In the opinion of listeners of the Program, she was the best pianist of the Chopin Competition. Although her average score from the competition judges placed her third overall, she received the highest score (three times) from the 17 judges .

References

External links
  of Kate Liu

1994 births
Prize-winners of the International Chopin Piano Competition
New Trier High School alumni
Curtis Institute of Music alumni
American classical musicians of Chinese descent
American classical pianists
American women classical pianists
21st-century classical pianists
Accompanists
People from Singapore
People from Winnetka, Illinois
People from Cook County, Illinois
Living people
21st-century American pianists
Singaporean pianists
21st-century American women pianists